Shen Yi-tseng (born 12 October 1980), better known by his stage name Ocean Ou or Ou De Yang or Happy House Cafe, is a Taiwanese Mandopop singer. Early in his career, he was known for keeping his face hidden from public view, using computer-generated 3D models for all his album covers and music videos. He was a member of a now defunct three-man band called Y.I.Y.O.

Discography
 2003 北半球有歐得洋
 2005 看見六色彩虹
 2005 有故事的人
 2007 101封情書
 2009 起飛 EP
 2011 留给幸福的十张纸条
 2015 因为有你

References 

1980 births
Living people
Taiwanese Mandopop singers